The Former Texas State Guard Association Medal is a medal within the awards and decorations of the Texas State Guard Nonprofit Association that may be awarded to a member of the Texas Military Forces.  This includes Air National Guard, Army National Guard, and State Guard.

Use
The Former Texas State Guard Association Medal is presented for previous membership in the Texas State Guard Association.  The ribbon and medals may now only be worn on appropriate Texas State Guard uniforms by former Texas State Guard Association life members (those who joined prior to the merger with NGAT). Life members of the association wear the hourglass device with the award. New supporters of the TXSGNA will receive this medal which authorizes the donor to wear the ribbon for the year of donation or permanently for Life Donors. Additionally, a bronze oak leaf cluster is authorized for wear on the medal for three consecutive years of annual donations.

References

External links
 https://tmd.texas.gov/texas-military-department-state-awards

Military in Texas
Awards and decorations of the Texas Military Forces